Antigonish—Guysborough was a federal electoral district in Nova Scotia, Canada, that was represented in the House of Commons of Canada from 1917 to 1968.

This riding was created in 1914 and combined the former ridings of Antigonish and Guysborough. Antigonish—Guysborough was abolished under redistribution in 1966 forming parts of Cape Breton Highlands—Canso and Central Nova.

Members of Parliament

This riding has elected the following Members of Parliament:

Election results

See also 

 List of Canadian federal electoral districts
 Past Canadian electoral districts

External links 
Riding history for Antigonish—Guysborough (1914–1966) from the Library of Parliament

Former federal electoral districts of Nova Scotia